Nazlıcan İnci (born 6 March 2000) is a Turkish badminton player. Teamed-up with Bengisu Erçetin, they grab the silver medal at the U17 European Championships in 2016. She won her first senior international tournament at the 2017 Turkey International tournament. İnci and Erçetin won the gold medal at the 2018 European Junior Championships, 2022 Mediterranean Games, and the silver medal at the 2018 Mediterranean Games.

Achievements

Mediterranean Games 
Women's doubles

European Junior Championships 
Girls' doubles

BWF International Challenge/Series (6 titles, 5 runners-up)
Women's doubles

  BWF International Challenge tournament
  BWF International Series tournament
  BWF Future Series tournament

References

External links 
 

2000 births
Living people
People from Erzincan
Turkish female badminton players
Badminton players at the 2018 Summer Youth Olympics
Competitors at the 2018 Mediterranean Games
Competitors at the 2022 Mediterranean Games
Mediterranean Games gold medalists for Turkey
Mediterranean Games silver medalists for Turkey
Mediterranean Games medalists in badminton
Badminton players at the 2019 European Games
European Games competitors for Turkey
21st-century Turkish women